Adriano Rimoldi (1912–1965) was an Italian film actor.

Career 
Born in La Spezia, Rimoldi started acting on stage while being a student of medicine at the University of Florence. After playing minor film roles, he had his breakout in 1940 as the male lead in the melodrama Goodbye Youth, alongside Maria Denis and Clara Calamai, two of the leading actresses of the Fascist era. After starring in Vittorio De Sica's The Children Are Watching Us he moved to Spain, returning in Italy in 1949. After his return, he failed to regain his status as a film leading actor, being mainly requested in character roles; he then focused on theatre, where he worked with Garinei & Giovannini, Curzio Malaparte and Dino Verde, and on television. He appeared alongside the world-famous comedy duo Laurel and Hardy in their final film Atoll K.

Selected filmography

 A Thousand Lire a Month (1939) - Un impiegato della radio
 Bridge of Glass (1940)
 Il signore della taverna (1940) - Il suo fidanzato
 Kean (1940) - Orazio nell' Amleto
 Miseria e nobiltà (1940) - Il marchesino Eugenio
 Goodbye Youth (1940) - Mario
 The Story of Tosca (1941) - Angelotti
 La compagnia della teppa (1941) - Giorgio Appiani
 Tosca (1941)
 Captain Tempest (1942) - Marcello Corner
 Tragic Night (1942) - Il conte Paolo Martorelli
 The Lion of Damascus (1942) - Marcello Corner
 Perdizione (1942) - Francesco
 Le vie del cuore (1942) - Giorgio Castellani, cugino di Anna
 Loves of Don Juan (1942) - Don Giovanni Tenorio
 Sempre più difficile (1943) - Stefano Turrisi
 Il viaggio del signor Perrichon (1943) - Daniele
 Turbante blanco (1943) - Alejandro Marcos
 La carica degli eroi (1943)
 Carmen (1944) - Marquez, le lieutenant des Dragons / Marquez, il tenente dei Dragoni
 The Children Are Watching Us (1944) - Roberto - l'amante di Nina
 Cabeza de hierro (1944) - Mosca
 Ni pobre, ni rico, sino todo lo contrario (1944) - Abelardo
 Hombres sin honor (1944) - Carlos Aguilar
 A Shadow at the Window (1945) - Luis Carvajal
 ¡Culpable! (1945) - Doctor Fernando Castillo
 El obstáculo (1945) - Enrique Díaz
 Aquel viejo molino (1946)
 Borrasca de celos (1946)
 Sinfonía del hogar (1947)
 Noche sin cielo (1947) - Padre Lorenzo
 Nada (1947) - Jaime
 El ángel gris (1947) - Pedro Pérez
 Anguish (1947) - Marcos
 Alhucemas (1948) - Capitán Suárez
 Las aguas bajan negras (1948) - Nolo
 La vida encadenada (1948)
 Pacto de silencio (1949) - John Brand
 Doce horas de vida (1949) - Miguel
 In a Corner of Spain (1949) - Vladimir
 Hand of Death (1949) - conte Orazio Altieri
 Mistress of the Mountains (1950) - Giàn, il contrabbandiere
 Captain Demonio (1950) - Capitan Demonio
 Dora la espía (1950) - Andres
 Si te hubieses casado conmigo (1950) - Alfonso / Carlos
 Atoll K (1950) - Giovanni Copini
 Red Seal (1950)
 The Reluctant Magician (1951) - Industriale
 The Two Sergeants (1951)
 Final Pardon (1952) - Renato Rocchi
 I, Hamlet (1952) - Marcello
 Voto di marinaio (1953)
 I Always Loved You (1953) - Giorgio
 La figlia del forzato (1953) - pittore Corrado
 Cuore di mamma (1954) - Denny Alescu
 Malagueña (1956) - Don Claudio
 Sendas marcadas (1957) - Inspector Ortega
 Cuatro en la frontera (1958) - don Rafael
 Azafatas con permiso (1959) - Alberto
 Los chicos (1959) - Novio de la vedette
 El precio de la sangre (1960)
 Juventud a la intemperie (1961) - Comisario Torres
 King of Kings (1961) - Melchior
 Han matado a un cadáver (1962) - Juan Planas
 L'amore difficile (1962) - Il marito (segment "L'avaro")
 Napoleone a Firenze (1964)
 Balearic Caper (1966) - (final film role)

References

Bibliography 
 Goble, Alan. The Complete Index to Literary Sources in Film. Walter de Gruyter, 1999.

External links 
 

1912 births
1965 deaths
People from La Spezia
Italian male film actors
20th-century Italian male actors
University of Florence alumni